The Minerva Theatre was a theatre located in Orwell Street in Kings Cross, Sydney. Originally a live venue, it was converted to the Metro Cinema in 1950, before returning to live shows in 1969. It ceased operating as a theatre in 1979. The Metro Minerva Theatre Action Group (MTAG) formed in 2019 is lobbying for its reinstatement.

History
In 1937, David N Martin, a theatrical publicity and advertising agent, formed a new theatre company named Minerva Centre Ltd to erect two live theatres on opposite sides of Macleay Street, Potts Point. An early design for the Orwell Street site by Bruce Dellit was rejected in favour of a more modest design by cinema specialists Crick & Furse, which opened on 18 May 1939 with a production of Robert Sherwood's Idiot's Delight. The site for the other proposed theatre site was acquired by the City of Sydney and is now the Fitzroy Gardens. The site in front of the Minerva facing Macleay Street was developed as the Minerva Cafe and Nightclub, with a vaulted roof.

In May 1941 it was leased by Whitehall Theatrical Productions, an independent production company. They remained in the venue for almost a decade, staging their last show there in April 1950.

Metro-Goldwyn-Mayer purchased the building in 1950 and converted to a movie theatre, renaming it the Metro Cinema. Harry M. Miller returned the venue to live theatre in 1969 with a production of the musical Hair.

In 1979 the building was converted to a market. It subsequently became offices for the Kennedy Miller film production company.

In 2019, Kennedy Miller sold the building to the Abacus Group, amidst hopes it might again become a live theatre.

Heritage listed by the City of Sydney including the interior, it was nominated by them to the NSW Heritage Register in 2019.

The Metro Minerva Theatre Action Group (MTAG) was formed in 2019 to lobby and campaign for the reinstatement of the Minerva to a fully functioning theatre

Design
The Art Deco theatre was designed for comfort, with lounge seating and only 1000 seats. The stage had a proscenium design and there were two small side stages.

The City of Sydney heritage citation states that :

"The Metro Theatre, although altered, is an exceptional example and represents the apotheosis of the Art Deco Streamline Moderne style in New South Wales. The Metro Theatre has an expertly controlled geometric massing of the exterior form, exhibiting all the trademarks of the Streamline Moderne style. Strongly influenced by Expressionism, the tower is one of the most strikingly successful Streamline Moderne structures ever realised in New South Wales. Although altered internally, the shell of the auditorium remains. Strongly influenced by Expressionism, the auditorium is one of the most striking theatre interiors ever realised in New South Wales."

References

Further reading

External links
 
 Metro Theatre (Part 2) at TheatreHeritage.org.au
 Metro Theatre (Part 3) at TheatreHeritage.org.au

1939 establishments in Australia
Former theatres in Sydney
Art Deco architecture in Sydney
Kings Cross, New South Wales
Theatres in Sydney
Cinemas in Sydney
Former cinemas